Naomi Simson (born 22 February 1964) is an Australian businessperson, entrepreneur, podcaster and blogger. After launching the Australian online success story RedBalloon in 2001, Naomi went on to co-found Big Red Group with partner David Anderson in 2017. Headquartered in Sydney's CBD, Big Red Group is the largest marketplace of experiences in ANZ, and home to leading brands including Adrenaline, Experience Oz, Experience Oz Local Agent, Lime&Tonic, and RedBalloon.   

Simson has written two books, Live What you Love (2015) and Ready to Soar (2016). 
She was a shark on the Australian television show Shark Tank.  She has won numerous awards, including the 2011 Ernst & Young Entrepreneur of the Year Award and the 2013 Lifetime Achievement Silver Stevie Award, and was ranked as a top-30 tech influencer on Twitter by The Business Insider.

Simson launched her podcast, Handpicked with Naomi Simson which is a short format podcast delivered each Monday. It is described as having a mini mentoring session with one of Australia's most successful entrepreneurs. Simson answers questions from business owners as well as bonus episode each week where she dives deeper into a business topic or term.

Career
Simson began her career in the corporate marketing field and gained experience with IBM, KPMG, Apple Computer Australia, and Ansett Australia. In 2001, she founded RedBalloon, an online experience gift retailer based in Australia. She began the company out of her house with a $25,000 personal investment and grew it to 46 employees by 2011. Simson was CEO of the company until 2011 when she took a step back from the operational side of the business. In 2017, Simson co-founded Big Red Group with David Anderson, a company that became the parent company for RedBalloon. It also acquired and operates the companies Adrenaline, Experience Oz, Experience Oz Local Agent and Lime&Tonic. 
 
In late 2014, Simson was named as one of five 'Sharks' on Network Ten's Shark Tank in Australia along with Andrew Banks, John McGrath, Steve Baxter, and Janine Allis. Simson’s time on Shark Tank was spent supporting the start-up community and investing in many businesses during all four seasons of the show. Simson had much advice for the start-up community about pitching, purpose and scaling. Simson has also been a guest host on Network Ten's Studio 10. 
 
Simson was a secret millionaire in the 2009 season of the reality television show The Secret Millionaire – Australia. On the show, Simson volunteered for 10 days in different disadvantaged areas of Australia. Upon conclusion of the show, Simson reveals her true identity to others and donates money to a number of the causes and individuals she volunteered for during the show. She was one of five benefactors for the season who gave more than $750,000 to various individuals and organisations in the community.
 
Simson is a blogger and owner of NaomiSimson.com, ranked number two in the 15 Top Business Blogs by SmartCompany.com as of 2016. Simson was named one of Australia’s best business bloggers as far back as 2009 and in 2020 was named top business blogger. Simson has the furthest reach for any Australian on the LinkedIn business networking platform with close to 3 million followers.

Simson is the author of two books, Live What You Love (2015) and Ready to Soar (2016). She was one of 13 authors who collaborated to write the 2008 book The Power of More Than One:Success Strategies from Australasia's Leading Business and Motivational Specialists and also wrote a preface for the 2013 book Appvertising – How Apps are Changing the World. In 2016 she released the book Ready to Soar: Turn Your Brilliant Idea into a Business You Love.

Simson is also a philanthropist and joined the council of Voiceless to spread the word about the need for greater animal protection. She is also an advisor to Heads Over Heels and a governor for the Cerebral Palsy Alliance.

Publications

Ready To Soar (2016) 
Live What You Love (2015)

Awards and recognition

Simson has won numerous awards throughout her career including the 2005 Westpac NSW Entrepreneur of the Year. Additional awards and recognition include the National Telstra Business Women's Award for Innovation in 2008, and being a 2011 finalist in BRW's Entrepreneur of the Year.

Simson was recognised by LinkedIn in 2012 as one of the World's Most Influential Thought Leaders, a recognition shared by only 150 people. She was one of only two from Australia with the other being Freelancer.com founder Matt Barrie. The recognition was part of LinkedIn's Influencer Campaign to share business knowledge, allowing Simson to author content to be shared with LinkedIn members.

As of 2017, Simson is one of the 10 business executives in Australia, to hold a "Power Profile" on LinkedIn.

In October 2018 Simson was named in The Australian Financial Review 100 Women of Influence awards in the Business and Entrepreneur category.

Select awards
 2013, Pearcey Entrepreneur of the Year Award
 2013, Lifetime Achievement Silver Stevie Award
 2011, Ernst & Young Entrepreneur of the Year Award
 2008, National Telstra Business Women's Award for Innovation
 2005, Westpac NSW Entrepreneur of the Year Award

References

External links
 Naomi Simson Website
Hanpicked with Naomi Simson Podcast
 Naomi Simson SmartCompany.co.au Contributions
 Naomi Simson LinkedIn Influencer Contributions

Living people
Australian non-fiction writers
Australian women writers
Participants in Australian reality television series
Australian investors
1964 births
Australian women company founders
Australian company founders